Navelgas is one of 44 parishes (administrative divisions) in Tineo, a municipality within the province and autonomous community of Asturias, in northern Spain.

It is the home of the Asturias Gold Museum.

Villages and hamlets

La Atalaya 
Barreiro 
Barzanallana 
La Carrizal 
Conto 
Foyedo
Fuentes 
Navelgas 
Sabadel de Navelgas 
Villar de Navelgas

Parishes in Tineo